The Shree Siddhivinayak Ganapati Mandir is a Hindu temple dedicated to Lord Shri Ganesh.  It is located in Prabhadevi, Mumbai, Maharashtra, India. It was originally built by Laxman Vithu and Deubai Patil on 19 November 1801. It is one of the richest temples in India.

The temple has a small mandap  with the shrine for Siddhi Vinayak ("Ganesha who grants your wish").  The wooden doors to the sanctum are carved with images of the Ashtavinayak (the eight manifestations of Ganesha in Maharashtra). The inner roof of the sanctum is plated with gold, and the central statue is of Ganesha. In the periphery, there is a Hanuman temple as well. The exterior of the temple consists of a dome which is lit up with multiple colors in the evenings and they keep changing every few hours. The statue of Shri Ganesha is located exactly under the dome. The pillars are carved out with the images of ashtvinayak.

Importance and status 
In the later half of the twentieth century the Siddhivinayak Mandir evolved from a small shrine to the grand temple of today.

Siddhivinayak is well known as "Navsacha Ganapati" or "Navasala Pavanara Ganapati" ('Ganapati bestows whenever humbly genuinely prayed a wish') among devotees. Facilities for performing different kind of puja are made available by the temple authorities.

History
It was constructed on 19 November 1801. The original structure of the Siddhivinayak Temple was a small 3.6 meter x 3.6 meters square brick structure with a dome-shaped brick shikhara. The temple was built by the contractor Laxman Vithu Patil. The building was funded by a rich Agri woman named Deubai Patil. Childless due to infertility, Deaubai built the temple so that Ganesha should grant children to other infertile women. Ramakrishna Jambhekar Maharaj, a disciple of the Hindu saint Akkalkot Swami Samarth, buried two divine idols in the front of the presiding deity of the temple on the orders of his guru. It is claimed that after 21 years of the burial of the icons, a mandar tree grew at that spot with a svayambhu Ganesha in its branches – as prophesied by Swami Samartha.

The 2550 temple complex had two 3.6 meter Deepamalas, a rest house and living quarters for the caretaker. It had an adjoining lake, 30 x 40 square meters in size on the eastern and southern side of the temple. The lake, dug by Nardulla in the early 19th century to counter the scarcity of water, was filled up in the later years and the land is now not part of the temple complex. Around 1952, a small Hanuman shrine was built in the temple complex for the Hanuman icon that was found during the road extension project of Sayani Road near Elphinstone Road. In the 1950s and 60s, the fame of the temple spread and a significant number of devotees began visiting. However, in the same period, the owner of the plot sold some of the temple land, reducing the complex area. After 1975, the number of devotees increased dramatically.

Governance
Temple donations and other activities related to temple are governed by the board members of Shree Siddhi Vinayak Ganpati Temple Trust. Trust is registered under Bombay Public Trusts Act, 1950, with the name “Shree Ganpati Temple at Prabhadevi Road, Dadar, Bombay".

Trust is regulated by Shree Siddhi Vinayak Ganpati Temple Trust (Prabhadevi) Act, 1980. It was adopted on 11 October 1980.

Aadesh Bandekar is current chairman of the trust.

Controversy
The Siddhivinayak temple receives donations of around  –  every year, which makes it Mumbai city's richest temple trust. In 2004, the Siddhivinayak Ganpati Temple Trust, which operates the temple, was accused of mismanaging donations. Consequently, the Bombay High Court appointed a committee headed by retired judge V P Tipnis to scrutinize the trust's donations and probe the allegations. The committee reported that "The most shocking aspect of the matter is that there is no method or principle followed for particular institutions. The only criteria for selection were recommendation or reference by trustees or the minister or a political heavy-weight, generally belonging to the ruling party".

In 2006 the Bombay High Court directed the state government, the Siddhivinayak Temple Trust and the petitioner Keval Semlani to prepare "suggestive guidelines" for using the temple's trust funds.

References

External links
 HD Images of Shree Siddhivinayak

Hindu temples in Mumbai
Ganesha temples
Religious buildings and structures completed in 1801